Radoje Vujoševic (born May 5, 1989) is a Montenegrin professional basketball player for Sutjeska of the Montenegrin Basketball League.

References

:Category:Sportspeople from Nikšić

1989 births
Living people
KK Budućnost players
KK Mornar Bar players
KK Sutjeska players
Montenegrin men's basketball players
Centers (basketball)